Jean-François Kahn (born 12 June 1938) is a French journalist and essayist.

Life and career
Born in Viroflay, Yvelines, he is the brother of scientists Axel Kahn and Olivier Kahn, and son of a Jewish father and a Catholic mother. Having obtained a degree in history, he started work at a postal sorting office, then at a printing works. He soon moved into journalism and was sent to cover the war in Algeria, undertaking the journalistic investigation that became known as the ‘Ben Barka affair’. Kahn then worked as a reporter for Paris-Press, L'Express and Europe 1. He later moved to Le Monde as special correspondent for North Africa. In 1977, he became editor of the compilation of the ‘Nouvelles Littéraires’ and in 1983, was named editor of Matin de Paris.  In 1984, he created L'Événement du Jeudi then in 1997, together with Maurice Szafran, started the weekly magazine, Marianne, where he was the editor in chief until 2007. He often writes under the pseudonym of François Darras or Serge Maury.

Kahn has taken a clear position on many media subjects, including:

Denouncing economic liberalism in 1995.
Denouncing the intervention of NATO in Serbia in 1999.
Denouncing the American-led intervention in Iraq in 2003.
He adopted a positive position on the European Constitution in 2005 but denounced the failure of the press to provide a proper platform for those who opposed it.
In 2007, he actively supported UDF candidate François Bayrou for the presidency.
In 2011, he dismissed the allegations of sexual assault against Dominique Strauss-Kahn as un troussage de domestique (literally, stripping or having casual, forced sex with a servant). He later apologised and resigned from journalism.

He forged the concept of Pensée unique.

Partial bibliography
 “God, How They Hated Him!”. Telos 44 (Summer 1980). New York: Telos Press.
 La guerre civile, Seuil, 1982
 Et si on essayait autre chose?, Seuil, 1983
 Les Français sont formidables, Balland, 1987
 Esquisse d'une philosophie du mensonge, Flammarion, 1992
 Tout change parce que rien ne change, Fayard, 1994
 On prend les mêmes et on recommence, Grasset et Fasquelle, 1997
 Les poèmes politiques, Fayard, 1998
 Tout était faux, Fayard, 1998
 Demain la révolution, Flammarion, 1999
 Chacun son tour, Stock, 2000
 Complot contre la Démocratie, Denoël, 2000
 La pensée unique, Fayard, 2000
 Le retour de terre de Djid Andrew ; Critique de la raison capitaliste, Fayard, 2000
 Victor Hugo un révolutionnaire ; L'extraordinaire Metamorphose, Fayard 2001
 Moi, l'Autre et le loup, Fayard, 2001
 Les Rebelles, ceux et celles qui ont dit non, Plon, 2001
 Ce que Marianne en pense, éditions des Mille et une nuits, 2002
 Le camp de la guerre, Critique de la déraison impure, Fayard, 2004
 Dictionnaire incorrect, Plon, 2005
 Comme deux frères - mémoire et visions croisées (avec Axel Kahn), Stock, 2006
 Les bullocrates, Fayard, 2006

References

1938 births
Living people
People from Yvelines
20th-century French journalists
20th-century French essayists
French columnists
French people of German-Jewish descent
French male essayists
21st-century French journalists
21st-century French essayists
French magazine founders